The molecular formula C15H23N3O4S (molar mass: 341.42 g/mol, exact mass: 341.1409 u) may refer to:

 Ciclacillin
 Sulpiride
 Levosulpiride

Molecular formulas